4-Hydroxybenzoate 3-hydroxylase may refer to:

 4-hydroxybenzoate 3-monooxygenase (NAD(P)H)
 4-hydroxybenzoate 3-monooxygenase